Adésọjí is a surname  of Yoruba origin, meaning "the crown or royalty has woken up". Notable people with the surname include:

Adekundo Adesoji, Nigerian Paralympic athlete
Adekunle Adesoji, Nigerian Paralympic athlete

Yoruba-language surnames